Itäkeskus (literal translation East center) is a quarter in the neighbourhood of Vartiokylä (as of the 1980s) in Helsinki, Finland. The district's main attraction is the largest covered-in shopping mall in the Nordic countries, Itis, which make Itäkeskus as the most significant commercial center of East Helsinki. The district has a station on the Helsinki Metro (Itäkeskus metro station), whose eastern entrance at the Tallinnanaukio square leads to the shopping centre. Itäkeskus has the eastern terminus of bus lines 500 and 550; the western terminus of line 500 is Munkkivuori and line 550 is Espoo's Westend bus station. Construction of the Jokeri light rail, which replaces bus line 550, began in 2019 and traffic is scheduled to begin in 2024. The most important road connection to the Helsinki central from Itäkeskus runs along Itäväylä.

At the end of 2018, 38.1 per cent of Itäkeskus' residents had a foreign background. About 12 percent of the residents had an African background, which was the largest share of all areas in Helsinki. At the end of 2020, the share of foreign language speakers is 41.2 per cent in Itäkeskus.

History

Itäkeskus has been built since the 1970s. The old K-Citymarket, which operated there, opened its doors on March 31, 1977, and its 67,246 m³ hall could accommodate a 6,500 m2 store. The Itäkeskus swimming hall was built in 1993.

Maamerkki, a high-rise building located on the Kauppakartanonkatu street near the Lyypekinaukio square in Itäkeskus, was completed in 1987. Today, it is the seventh highest high-rise building in Finland and the fourth highest in Helsinki (after Majakka and Loisto in Kalasatama and Cirrus in Vuosaari).

On the other side of the Itäväylä, opposite Itis, is the another shopping center called Easton Helsinki, which was completed in October 2017.

Politics
Results of the 2011 Finnish parliamentary election in Itäkeskus:

Social Democratic Party   22.2%
True Finns   19.9%
National Coalition Party   17.7%
Green League   14.3%
Left Alliance   10.8%
Centre Party   5.0%
Swedish People's Party   4.7%
Christian Democrats   2.6%

See also
Helsinki Metro
Herttoniemi
Geography of Helsinki
Malmi, Helsinki
Ring I

References

External links

 Itäkeskus | My Helsinki (in English)

Quarters of Helsinki